Quarter is a village in South Lanarkshire, Scotland, on the hill above the Clyde Valley.

History
Francis Groome described the village in 1884-4 thus:
"Quarter Ironworks and Darngaber, a conjoint village in Hamilton parish, Lanarkshire, 3 miles S of Hamilton town and ½ mile ENE of Quarter Road station on the Strathaven branch of the Caledonian railway. It has a post office (Quarter) under Hamilton, an Established chapel of ease, a public school, and iron-works with five blast furnaces. The chapel of ease is an Early Decorated edifice of 1884, containing 430 sittings. Pop. (1871) 544, (1881) 886.—Ord. Sur., sh. 23, 1865."

Coal Mine
The coal mine at Quarter belonged to the Duke of Hamilton. On 16 March 1841 there was a fatal accident arising because of an underground explosion. The seven workers (one a boy) underground at the time died instantaneously. Four other workers died while trying to rescue them. In his teens the labour activist Keir Hardie worked as a pony driver and then as a Hewer here.

Ironworks
The Quarter Ironworks were established in 1865 and remained open until 1885. In 1880 they had 5 blast furnaces.

References

Villages in South Lanarkshire
Ironworks and steelworks in Scotland
Coal mines in Scotland
Hamilton, South Lanarkshire
Mining communities in Scotland